CLK may refer to:

 Cadillac and Lake City Railway
 Public Schools of Calumet-Laurium-Keweenaw
 Calumet High School (Calumet, Michigan)
  (ČLK), a Czech doctors' organization; see David Rath
 Chek Lap Kok, the island where the newer Hong Kong International Airport is located; the airport is also known as Chep Lap Kok airport
 Clackmannanshire, historic county in Scotland (Chapman code: CLK)
 Clinton Regional Airport, Oklahoma, USA (IATA code: CLK)
 Clock House railway station, London, England (National Rail station code CLK)
 Confederation of Labour of Kazakhstan
 ISO 639:clk or Idu Mishmi language, spoken by the Mishmi people
 Mercedes-Benz CLK-Class
 A CLK (clock) pin in an electric circuit; see Intel 8253

See also

 
 
 CLK-1 (disambiguation)
 CLK2, a human gene
 CLK3 (disambiguation)